Pitana may refer to:
Néstor Pitana, Argentinian actor
Pitana (Laconia), a town in ancient Laconia, Greece

See also 
 Pitane (disambiguation)